Brandon Denson (born July 22, 1987) is a former American football defensive end. He played college football at Michigan State University and attended Willow Run High School in Ypsilanti, Michigan. He was a member of the Hamilton Tiger-Cats, Montreal Alouettes, Ottawa Redblacks, and Cleveland Gladiators. Denson tried out for the Carolina Panthers at rookie camp in 2012. He competed in the eighth season of American Ninja Warrior in 2016. He currently is a disciplinarian at Voyageur Academy in Detroit, Michigan.

References

External links
Just Sports Stats
Michigan State Spartans profile
AFL profile
Ottawa Redblacks profile

Living people
1987 births
Players of American football from Michigan
American football defensive ends
Canadian football defensive linemen
Michigan State Spartans football players
Hamilton Tiger-Cats players
Montreal Alouettes players
Cleveland Gladiators players
Ottawa Redblacks players
American Ninja Warrior contestants
Sportspeople from Ypsilanti, Michigan
Players of Canadian football from Michigan